Ralph J. Block (June 21, 1889, Cherokee – January 2, 1974, Wheaton) was an American film producer in the 1920s and became a full-time screenwriter in 1930. He is most famous for being President of the Screen Writers Guild from 1934 to 1935. He received an Honorary Academy Award in 1940 for his dedicated work for the Motion Picture Relief Fund.

Biography
Block was born in the City of Cherokee in the Cherokee County of Iowa to E.S. and Doris Block (née Chraplewski).

Filmography

As producer

As Writer

References

External links

1889 births
1974 deaths
American film producers
Academy Honorary Award recipients
Presidents of the Screen Actors Guild
American male screenwriters
University of Michigan alumni
American male non-fiction writers
20th-century American male writers
20th-century American screenwriters